Whitebait (disambiguation) may refer to:
 Whitebait, the juvenile of various fish species worldwide
 Whitebait Smelt, a species of smelt (Allosmerus elongatus) that lives off the west coast of North America
 Operation Whitebait, a small air attack on Berlin during the Second World War to divert German night fighters from Operation Hydra, an attack on the Peenemünde Army Research Center